Tennessee Bible College is a private college located in Cookeville, Tennessee, United States.  It is supported by Churches of Christ and members of the Church of Christ.  Tennessee Bible College is authorized by the Tennessee Higher Education Commission.

History
Tennessee Bible College was founded in 1975 by the first president of the college, Malcolm Hill.  His vision was to create a college to train preachers and Bible workers.  Teaching the Bible only and no manmade doctrine or creed is the emphasis. Special emphasis is given to apologetics.

Distance learning
TBC also has an online college, through which students can receive a degree or certificate. The college also has a free Bible correspondence course.

Degrees
 Two-year diploma in Bible
 Bachelor of Religious Education (BRE)
 Master of Theology (Th.M.)
 Doctor of Theology (Th.D.)

Presidents
 Malcolm Hill: 1975–2010
 David Hill: 2010–present

Notable alumni and faculty
 Thomas B. Warren, faculty member, Restoration theologian, and religious philosopher

References

External links
 https://www.tn-biblecollege.edu

Bible colleges
Educational institutions established in 1975
Education in Putnam County, Tennessee
Seminaries and theological colleges in Tennessee
Buildings and structures in Putnam County, Tennessee